This list of world junior speed skating records is an overview of the current junior speed skating records in its various events ratified by the International Skating Union. Juniors are those who haven't become 19 years at the start of the season, 1 July.

Men

Women

References

External links
World junior records 19 November 2022 updated

Speed skating records
Speed skating-related lists